The Canadian Forces Chief Warrant Officer (abbreviated CFCWO) is the senior non-commissioned member appointment in the Canadian Armed Forces. The post was created in 1978 with the first appointment of Chief Warrant Officer Robert Osside. CFCWO is a position created by the chief of the Defence Staff to assist the CDS in his duties and advise him on all issues relating to non-commissioned members.

Rank and insignia
The CFCWO holds the substantive rank of chief warrant officer (if Army or Air Force) or chief petty officer 1st class (if Navy). Even if the incumbent is a chief petty officer, the appointment title remains "Canadian Forces chief warrant officer".

The rank insignia of the CFCWO is the coat of arms of Canada in coloured thread, surrounded by a wreath of 20 maple leaves in gold thread, worn on the lower sleeve of the service dress jacket. The cap badge is the coat of arms of Canada, in full-colour metallic thread.

List of appointment holders

References

Canadian Armed Forces
Military appointments of Canada
Warrant officers